Charles Edward Compton Kendle (10 February 1875 – 3 January 1954) was an English first-class cricketer. Kendle was a right-handed batsman who played primarily as a wicket-keeper.

Kendle made his first-class debut for Hampshire in 1899 against Leicestershire. Kendle made two first-class appearances for Hampshire in 1899, his second and final first-class match coming against Yorkshire.

In 1911 Kendle joined Wiltshire, making his debut against the Kent Second XI in the Minor Counties Championship. Kendle played five matches for Wiltshire, with his final Minor Counties match coming against the Surrey Second XI in 1914, where the season was curtailed due to the beginning of the First World War.

Kendle died in Hellingly, Sussex, on 3 January 1954.

Family
Kendle's nephew William Kendle also played first-class cricket for Hampshire, representing the club in five first-class matches.

External links
Charles Kendle at Cricinfo
Charles Kendle at CricketArchive

1875 births
1954 deaths
People from Amesbury
People from Hellingly
English cricketers
Hampshire cricketers
Wiltshire cricketers